The 2000 Coca-Cola 600, the 41st running of the event, was a NASCAR Winston Cup Series race held on May 28, 2000 at Lowe's Motor Speedway in Concord, North Carolina. Contested for 400 laps on the 1.5 mile (2.4 km) speedway, it was the twelfth race of the 2000 NASCAR Winston Cup Series season. Matt Kenseth of Roush Racing won the race, earning his first career Winston Cup Series win.

Ted Musgrave (No. 15), Steve Grissom (No. 44), Ed Berrier (No. 90), Darrell Waltrip (No. 66), and Dave Marcis (No. 71) all failed to qualify for the event.  Carl Long (No. 85) qualified 35th, but he gave up his race seat so Darrell Waltrip could compete in one final Coca-Cola 600.  During a red flag for rain, Carl took over for Darrell and finished the race.  This was Bud Moore's last attempt as a car owner, ending four decades of racing for the hall of famer.

Robby Gordon (No. 13) was attempting to do the 'double,' competing in the Indianapolis 500 and the Coca-Cola 600 on the same day.  Rain delays at Indianapolis did not allow Robby to start the 600.  P. J. Jones started the car and is credited with the start and points.  Robby took over the car after a rain delay for rain.

Early in the race, Tim Fedewa took over driving duties from John Andretti (No. 43) as Andretti was still recovering from injuries suffered in a practice crash and a crash in the previous week's The Winston all-star race.

The race featured five cars with military paint schemes, similar to the 1991 Daytona 500.  Dale Jarrett (No. 88, Air Force), Ricky Rudd (No. 28, Marines), Bobby Hamilton (No. 4, Navy), Mike Skinner (No. 31, Army), and Jerry Nadeau (No. 25, Coast Guard) were the participants.  Other notable paint schemes featured included Dale Earnhardt's brightly-colored Peter Max scheme, Jeff Gordon's "End of the Rainbow," Ken Schrader's Green M&Ms, and Terry Labonte's Berry Swirl Froot Loops.  Many schemes carried over from The Winston.

The top five drivers from the Carsdirect.com 400 at Las Vegas (Jeff Burton, Tony Stewart, Mark Martin, Bill Elliott, and Bobby Labonte) earlier in the season competed for the Winston No Bull 5 million dollar bonus.  None of them won the bonus.

On the day of the race, 0.13 inches of precipitation were recorded around the speedway.

Background

Lowe's Motor Speedway is a motorsports complex located in Concord, North Carolina, United States, 13 miles from Charlotte, North Carolina. The complex features a 1.5 miles (2.4 km) quad oval track that hosts NASCAR racing including the prestigious Coca-Cola 600 on Memorial Day weekend and The Winston, as well as the UAW-GM Quality 500. The speedway was built in 1959 by Bruton Smith and is considered the home track for NASCAR with many race teams located in the Charlotte area. The track is owned and operated by Speedway Motorsports Inc. (SMI) with Marcus G. Smith (son of Bruton Smith) as track president.

Top 10 results

Race statistics
 Time of race: 4:12:23
 Average Speed: 
 Pole Speed: 186.034
 Cautions: 7 for 38 laps
 Margin of Victory: 0.573 sec
 Lead changes: 25
 Percent of race run under caution: 9.5%
 Average green flag run: 45.2 laps

References

Coca-Cola 600
Coca-Cola 600
NASCAR races at Charlotte Motor Speedway